Ferdinand Laloue (1794 in Passy – 27 September 1850) was a French dramatist, librettist and theatre producer.

Administrator of the Théâtre du Cirque-Olympique, he also was director of the Hippodrome and the théâtre des Délassements comiques. His onerous plays with fastuous settings were performed on the most important Parisian stages (Théâtre des Folies-Dramatiques, Théâtre de la Porte-Saint-Martin, Théâtre du Châtelet, Théâtre des Variétés etc.).

Works 

 Le Fort de la halle, vaudeville in 1 act, with Michel-Nicolas Balisson de Rougemont and Pierre Carmouche, 1821
 Le Petit Georges, ou la Croix d'honneur, comedy in 1 act, 1821
 La Bataille de Bouvines, ou le Rocher des tombeaux, mimodrame in 3 acts, with René Perin, 1822
 L'Arabe hospitalier, melodrama in 1 act, 1822
 La diligence attaquée, or L'auberge des Cévennes, with Constant Ménissier and Ernest Renaud, 1822
 La Fille à marier ou La Double éducation, comédie en vaudevilles in 1 act, with Ménissier and Saint-Hilaire, 1822
 La guerre ou la parodie de la paix, burlesque tragedy in five acts in verses, with Théaulon and Armand d'Artois, 1822
 L'Oiseleur et le pêcheur, ou la Bague perdue, vaudeville in 1 act, with Carmouche and X.-B. Saintine, 1822
 La Réconciliation, ou la Veille de la Saint-Louis, tableau-vaudeville in 1 act, with Carmouche and Frédéric de Courcy, 1822
 Les deux forçats, folie en 1 acte, with Ménissier and Renaud, 1823
 Les Invalides, ou Cent ans de gloire, tableau militaire in 2 acts, mingled with couplets, with Jean-Toussaint Merle, 1823
 Le Dévouement filial, ou Marseille en 1720, mimodrame in 1 act, with Henri Simon, 1823
 Le Fermier d'Arcueioisl, vaudeville in 1 act, with Nicolas Brazier and Carmouche, 1823
 Le Roulier, mimodrame in 3 acts, with Ménissier and Saint-Hilaire, 1823
 Les Marchands forains, ou le Mouton, vaudeville in 1 act, 1823
 La Saint-Louis au bivouac, scènes militaires, mingled with couplets, with Merle and Simon, 1823
 Le commissionnaire, with Pierre-Jean Aniel, Eugène Cantiran de Boirie and Constant Ménissier, 1824
 Le Conscrit, vaudeville in 1 act, with Jean-Toussaint Merle and Antoine Jean-Baptiste Simonnin, 1824
 L'homme de 60 ans ou la petite entêtée, comedy vaudeville in 1 act, with Armand d'Artois and Simonnin, 1824
 Melmoth, ou l'Homme errant, mimodrame in 3 acts, with Saint-Hilaire, 1824
 Le Porteur d'eau, mimodrame in 3 acts, with Théaulon and Simonnin, 1824
 Le soldat et le perruquier, comédie en vaudevilles in 1 act, with Michel-Nicolas Balisson de Rougemont and Simonnin, 1824
 Les Deux cousins, comédie en vaudevilles in 3 acts, with Paul Duport and Amable de Saint-Hilaire, 1825
 Monsieur Charles, or Une matinée à Bagatelle, comédie en vaudevilles in 1 act, with Merle, 1825
 Le Valet en bonne fortune, ou les Amies de pension, comedy in 1 act, mingled with couplets, with Simonnin, 1825
 L'Égoïste par régime, comédie en vaudevilles in 1 act, with Charles de Longchamps, 1826
 Le Vieillard d'Ivry, or 1590 and 1825, vaudeville in 2 tableaux, with Marc-Antoine Désaugiers, Jean Coralli and Merle, 1825
 Le Prisonnier amateur, comedy mingled with couplets, with Armand d'Artois, Alexis Decomberousse and Frédérick Lemaître, 1826
 Le Vieux pauvre, ou le Bal et l'incendie, melodrama in 3 acts, with Charles Dupeuty and Ferdinand de Villeneuve, 1826
 Le Bon père, comedy in 1 act, with Achille and Armand d'Artois, 1827
 L'Ami intime, comedy in 1 act, with Emmanuel Théaulon and Achille d'Artois, 1828
 Le Cousin Giraud, comédie en vaudevilles in 1 act, with Charles Dupeuty and Simonnin, 1828
 L’Éléphant du roi de Siam, play in 3 acts and 9 parts, with Adolphe Franconi, Léopold Chandezon and Albert Monnier, 1829
 La prise de la Bastille ; Passage du Mont Saint-Bernard, with Nézel, 1830
 L'Empereur, événements historiques in 5 acts and 18 tableaux, with Franconi and Auguste Le Poitevin de L'Égreville, 1830
 Les Lions de Mysore, three-act play with 7 tableaux, 1831
 Mingrat, melodrama in 4 acts, 1831
 Dgenguiz-Khan or La conquête de la Chine, 1837
 Le géant ou David et Goliath, biblical play in 4 acts and 9 tableaux, with Bourgeois, 1838
 Le Sac à charbon, ou le Père Jean, comédie en vaudevilles in 1 act, with Carmouche, 1838
 Le Lion du désert, play in three acts and six tableaux, with Fabrice Labrousse, 1839
 Bélisario, ou L'opéra impossible, with Carmouche, 1839
 Le Bambocheur, vaudeville in 1 act, with Carmouche, 1839
 Les Pêcheurs du Tréport, vaudeville in 1 act, with Bourgeois, 1839
 Les Pilules du diable, féerie in 3 acts and 20 tableaux, with Bourgeois, 1839
 L'Uniforme du grenadier, tableau militaire in 1 act, with de Courcy, 1839
 Le mirliton enchanté, 1840
 L'orangerie de Versailles, comédie en vaudevilles in 3 acts, with Bourgeois, 1840
 Mazagran, bulletin de l'armée d'Afrique, play in 3 acts, with Charles Desnoyer, 1840
 La Ferme de Montmirail (episodes from 1812 to 1814), pièce militaire in 3 acts and 4 tableaux, with Labrousse, 1840
 Le Dernier vœu de l'Empereur, 5 tableaux, with Labrousse, 1841
 Anita la bohémienne, vaudeville in three acts, with Pierre Carmouche, 1841
 Le Marchand de bœufs, vaudeville in 2 acts, with Bourgeois, 1841
 M. Morin, vaudeville in 1 act, with Labrousse, 1841
 Murat, play in 3 acts and 14 tableaux, with Labrousse, 1841
 Pauline ou Le Châtiment d'une mère, drama in 3 acts, with Labrousse, 1841
 Le Prince Eugène et l'Impératrice Joséphine, 1842
 Le Chien des Pyrénées, play in 2 acts and 6 tableaux, with Labrousse, 1842
 Un rêve de mariée, vaudeville in 1 act, with Bourgeois, 1842
 Don quichotte et Sancho Pança, play in 2 acts and 13 tableaux, with Bourgeois, 1843
 Le Palais-royal et la Bastille, drame-vaudeville in 4 acts, with Labrousse, 1843
 Brisquet ou L'héritage de mon oncle, with Théodore Nézel, 1843
 Le Vengeur, action navale de 1794, play in 3 acts, with Labrousse, 1843
 La Corde de pendu, féerie in 3 acts and 19 tableaux, with Auguste Anicet-Bourgeois, 1844
 L'Empire, play in three acts and 18 tableaux, with Labrousse, 1845
 Louis XVI et Marie-Antoinette, drama in 6 acts and 10 tableaux, with Labrousse, 1849
 Rome, drama in 5 acts and 12 tableaux, with Labrousse, 1849

Bibliography 
 Joseph Marie Quérard, Félix Bourquelot, Charles Louandre, La littérature française contemporaine. XIXe siècle, 1852, (p. 560) Lire en ligne
 Guy Dumur, Histoire des spectacles, 1965, (p. 1864)

External links 
 Encyclopædia Universalis
 Idref

19th-century French dramatists and playwrights
Librettists
1794 births
1850 deaths